Sikh massacre may refer to:
Vaḍḍā Ghallūghārā
Chhōtā Ghallūghārā
Jallianwala Bagh massacre (1919)
1984 anti-Sikh riots